Tele Rebelde is Cuba's second national television network, founded in 1968.

History
Tele Rebelde was officially launched on July 22, 1968, in the city of Santiago de Cuba. It broadcast its signal to the then Oriente province and aimed to reflect the region in which it was based. It broadcast a wide variety of programs for six hours a day from Monday through Saturday and on Sunday afternoons. In 1975, it became the first station to switch to NTSC color, followed by Channel 2 in Havana.

In 1979, Tele Rebelde from Santiago de Cuba and Channel 2 in Havana were merged into a unified brand, the new network retained most of the programming and the name of the Santiago de Cuba station while also opening a new studio facility.

Programming
The channel's programming is primarily sports, with the exception of the evening magazine, which is also transmitted by Cubavisión International, with the inclusion of domestic and foreign programs distributed by thematic blocks depending on the schedule.  From Monday to Saturday, the channel begins with the news magazine Good Morning, Awakening All Cuba, and reports of world and national events, emphasizing culture and sport, with the rest of the morning programming block dedicated to sports and fitness. Aside from its local and international coverage of different sports such as football, cycling, motor sports among others in which the country takes part, its flagship sports coverages are on baseball, primary on the Cuban baseball league system and is the official television partner of the Cuba national baseball team. One of its high rating broadcasts are those of the Cuban National Series season matches, from the opening day leading up to the playoffs and the national finals, as well as of the mid-year Super Series, and since 2014 is also the national broadcaster of the Caribbean Series.

The channel also broadcasts cultural programming, including those in the performing arts and Cuban cinema.

Sports coverage
These sporting events are broadcast by Tele Rebelde and are produced by the ICRT for the channel.

Football
 Campeonato Nacional de Fútbol de Cuba
 La Liga
 Copa del Rey
 UEFA Champions League
 UEFA Europa League
 2024 Copa América
 2022 FIFA World Cup qualification (CONCACAF)
 2022 FIFA World Cup qualification (CONMEBOL)
 2022 FIFA World Cup qualification (UEFA)
 UEFA Super Cup
 Bundesliga
 DFB-Pokal
 Premier League
 FA Cup
 Serie A
 Coppa Italia
 Ligue 1
 Coupe de France
 Major League Soccer
 including MLS All Star Game and MLS Cup Playoffs
 CONCACAF Champions League
 CONCACAF Gold Cup
 UEFA Euro
 FIFA World Cup

Baseball
 Cuban National Series - flagship broadcast
 Cuban Elite League
 Caribbean Series
 Major League Baseball
 including All Star Game, postseason games and the World Series
 World Baseball Classic
 WBSC Premier12
 All WBSC Baseball World Cups (U-12, U-15, U-18, U-23)

Basketball
 National Basketball Association
 EuroLeague
 EuroCup
 Liga Superior de Baloncesto
 Liga de las Américas
 FIBA Americas Championship
 FIBA CaribeBasket
 FIBA CentroBasket

Multi-sport events
 2020 Summer Olympics
 2024 Summer Olympics
 2018 Central American and Caribbean Games
 2018 Summer Youth Olympics
 2019 Pan American Games
 2023 Summer Youth Olympics

Other events
 National Football League
 including playoffs and Super Bowl
 National Hockey League
 MotoGP
 Formula 1
 Dakar Rally
 NASCAR Cup Series
 IndyCar Series
 Italian Volleyball League
 Major cycling events:
 Giro d'Italia
 Tour de France
 Vuelta a España
 Paris–Tours
 Volta a Catalunya
 Tour of Belgium

Programs
 Noticiero Nacional Deportivo
 Revista Buenos Días
 Beisbol de Siempre
 Bola Viva
 Confesiones de Grandes
 A Todo Motor
 Gol 360
 Súmate
 Vale 3
 Meridiano Deportivo
 Al duro y sin guante
 Glorias Deportivas 
 A 3 tiempos
 Estocada al Tiempo
 Lente Deportivo
 Resumen Bundesliga
 Volvemos al Juego

See also 
 Television in Cuba

Television in Cuba
Television channels and stations established in 1968
Sports television networks